The Vulcan V18 is a semi-automatic rifle based on the ArmaLite AR-180, chambered in 5.56×45mm NATO. It was built using a modified carbon fiber AR-15 lower receiver coupled with a modified AR-180 upper receiver formed from heat treated SAE 4130 steel. Standard features of the rifle include an A2-style flash hider, 20” chrome lined barrel with a 1-7” twist, FAL-style hand guard, and polymer side-folding stock. Additionally, it utilizes STANAG magazines.

References

5.56×45mm NATO semi-automatic rifles